The Transgender District, formerly known as Compton's Transgender Cultural District, is the first legally recognized transgender district in the world. Named after the first documented uprising of transgender and queer people in United States history, the Compton's Cafeteria riot of 1966, the district encompasses six blocks in the southeastern Tenderloin, San Francisco, and crosses over Market Street to include two blocks of Sixth Street. It was co-founded by Honey Mahogany, Janetta Johnson, and Aria Sa'id; Sa'id serves as the executive director.

The cultural district was established via ordinance by the San Francisco Board of Supervisors in 2017. In July 2019, the board allocated $300,000 in seed money to support the district. District projects planned for 2020 include a coffee shop that will provide job training for local trans people of color.

In March 2020, the district announced a name change to simply The Transgender District. Executive director Aria Sa'id explained that they did not wish to "continue honoring [Gene Compton] and his restaurant", as "he was a huge reason behind having drag queens, queer, and trans folks arrested".

In April 2022, the San Francisco Redistricting Task Force adopted a new district map that moved most of the Transgender District from District 6 to District 5, angering some community members.

In May 2022, the district announced that they would be pulling out of Pride events sponsored by the City and County of San Francisco. This decision was in response to Mayor London Breed pulling out of the 2022 Pride parade, in protest of San Francisco Pride's decision to prohibit police officers from marching in uniform. At the City's Pride flag raising and press conference on June 2, Mayor Breed announced that Pride had reached a compromise with the police, and she would once again march in the parade. Transgender District director Aria Sa'id attended the flag raising after learning of the new agreement.

In June 2022, the Board of Supervisors voted unanimously to designate the intersection of Turk and Taylor streets in the district as a historic landmark.

References

External links

Historic districts in California
LGBT culture in San Francisco
Neighborhoods in San Francisco
Transgender history in the United States
Tenderloin, San Francisco
2017 establishments in California
2017 in LGBT history